Lee Joon-ha (born April 15, 2001) is a South Korean actress. Lee began her career as a child actress, notably as the protagonist's daughter in the thriller Midnight FM (2010).

Filmography

Film

Television series

References

External links 
 
 
 

2001 births
Living people
South Korean child actresses
South Korean television actresses
South Korean film actresses
People from Seoul